Bourne is an English surname. Notable people with the surname include:

 Adeline Bourne (1873–1965), Anglo-Indian actress, suffragette, and charity worker
 Alan Bourne (1882–1967), senior officer in the Royal Marines
 Albert Bourne (1862–1930), English footballer
 Aleck Bourne (1886–1974), British gynaecologist and writer tried in a landmark 1938 case for an illegal abortion
 Alfred Bourne (disambiguation)
 Alfred Gibbs Bourne (1859–1940), English zoologist, botanist, and educator
 Ansel Bourne (1826–1910), American evangelical preacher, among the first documented cases of multiple personality and amnesia 
 Arthur Bourne (1880–?), English footballer
 Avery Bourne, politician
 Benjamin Bourne (1755–1808), American jurist and politician from Rhode Island
 Bette Bourne (born 1939)
 Bill Bourne (born 1954), Canadian musician and songwriter
 Bob Bourne (born 1954), Canadian ice hockey player
 Charles Bourne (1882–1930), Australian rules footballer
 Charlie Bourne (1906–1958), Australian rules footballer
 Chester Bourne (1889–?), Guyanese cricketer
 Chris Bourne (born 1985), English footballer
 Clayton Bourne (1904–1986), Canadian swimmer
 Clive Bourne (1942–2007), British businessman and philanthropist
 Daniel Bourne (born 1955), American poet and translator
 Danika Bourne (born 1981), Australian ice dancer
 Debra Bourne (born 1960), communications expert, brand consultant and advocate
 Dickie Bourne (1879–1954), English footballer
 Doug Bourne (1908–1980), Australian rules footballer
 Edmund Bourne, American self-help author, psychologist, and researcher
 Edward Gaylord Bourne (1860–1908), American historian
 Eleanor Elizabeth Bourne (1878–1957), first Queensland woman to study medicine
 Ernie Bourne (1926–2009), English Australian actor, entertainer, comedian, and puppeteer
 Eulalia Bourne (1892–1984), pioneer Arizona schoolteacher, rancher and author
 Evan Bourne (born 1983), ring name of American professional wrestler Matt Sydal
 Francis Bourne (1861–1935), English prelate of the Catholic Church
 Frank Bourne (1854–1945), British soldier and last known survivor of the Battle of Rorke's Drift
 Frank Card Bourne (1914–1983), American classicist
 Frederick Bourne (disambiguation)
 Frederick Gilbert Bourne (1859–1919), founder of the Singer Manufacturing Company
 George Bourne (1780–1845), American abolitionist and editor
 Holly Bourne, British author
 Hugh Bourne (1772–1852), joint founder of Primitive Methodism, the largest offshoot of Wesleyan Methodism
 James Bourne (born 1983), British singer-songwriter
 John Bourne (artist) (born 1943), British artist and painter
 John Cooke Bourne (1814–1896), artist and engraver
 Jonathan Bourne Jr. (1855–1940), U.S. Senator from Oregon
 JR Bourne (born 1970), Canadian actor
 Kendrick Bourne (born 1995), American football player
 London Bourne (1793–1869), former Barbadian slave who became a wealthy merchant and abolitionist
 Matthew Bourne (born 1960), British choreographer
 Munroe Bourne (1910–1992), Canadian swimmer
 Nick Bourne (born 1952), British politician
 Peter Bourne (born 1939), anthropologist, writer, and civil servant
 Philip Bourne (born 1953), scientist
 Possum Bourne (1956–2003), New Zealand rally car driver
 Randolph Bourne (1886–1918), American Progressivist writer and essayist
 Samuel Bourne (1834–1912), British photographer of India
 Shae-Lynn Bourne (born 1976), Canadian ice dancer
 Stephen R. Bourne (born 1944), British-born computer scientist
 Teddy Bourne (born 1948), British Olympic épée fencer
 Una Mabel Bourne (1882–1974), Australian pianist and composer

Characters
 Jason Bourne (first appeared 1980), created by Robert Ludlum

See also 
 Borne (disambiguation)
 Bourne (disambiguation)
 Burne, a surname

English-language surnames